The 2016 Atlantic Hockey Tournament is the 12th Atlantic Hockey Tournament. It will be played between March 4 and March 19, 2016, at campus locations and at the Blue Cross Arena in Rochester, New York. By winning the tournament, RIT earned Atlantic Hockey's automatic bid to the 2016 NCAA Division I Men's Ice Hockey Tournament.

Format
The tournament features four rounds of play. In the first round the sixth and eleventh, seventh and tenth, and eighth and ninth seeds, as determined by the conference regular season standings, will play a best-of-three series with the winners advancing to the quarterfinals. The top five teams from the conference regular season standings receive a bye to the quarterfinals. There, the first seed and lowest-ranked first round winner, the second seed and second-highest-ranked first round winner, the third seed and highest-ranked first round winner, and the fourth seed and the fifth seed will play a best-of-three series, with the winners advancing to the semifinals. In the semifinals, the highest and lowest seeds and second-highest and second-lowest remaining seeds will play a single game each, with the winners advancing to the championship game. The tournament champion will receive an automatic bid to the 2015 NCAA Division I Men's Ice Hockey Tournament.

Standings
Note: GP = Games played; W = Wins; L = Losses; T = Ties; PTS = Points; GF = Goals For; GA = Goals Against

Bracket
Air Force and Holy Cross finished tied for second place; Air Force is the second seed based on the third tiebreaker (head-to-head goal differential). Army and Canisius finished tied for sixth place; Army is the sixth seed based on the first tiebreaker (head-to-head results). Niagara and American International finished tied for tenth place; Niagara is the tenth seed based on the first tiebreaker.

Note: * denotes overtime period(s)

Results

First round

(6) Army vs. (11) American International

(7) Canisius vs. (10) Niagara

(8) Bentley vs. (9) Sacred Heart

Quarterfinals

(1) Robert Morris vs. (8) Bentley

(2) Air Force vs. (7) Canisius

(3) Holy Cross vs. (6) Army

(4) Mercyhurst vs. (5) RIT

Semifinals

(1) Robert Morris vs. (6) Army

(2) Air Force vs. (5) RIT

Championship

(1) Robert Morris vs. (5) RIT

Tournament awards

All-Tournament Team
G Mike Rotolo (RIT)
D Chase Norrish (RIT)
D Alexander Kuqali (RIT)
F Myles Powell* (RIT)
F Liam Kerins (RIT)
F David Friedmann (Robert Morris)
* Most Valuable Player(s)

References

Atlantic Hockey Tournament
Atlantic Hockey Tournament